Georg Tripp (born 18 March 1941 in Marburg) is a German football player and coach and coach. He played as a forward for VfL Marburg, 1. FC Köln, Kickers Offenbach, Mainz 05, FC Metz, CS Sedan, Olympique Avignonnais, AS Angoulême, Stade Lavallois and RC Paris. After his playing career, he became a coach with AS Douanes and Inter Luanda.

External links and references

 

1941 births
Living people
Sportspeople from Marburg
German footballers
Footballers from Hesse
Association football forwards
Ligue 1 players
Ligue 2 players
VfB Marburg players
1. FC Köln players
Kickers Offenbach players
1. FSV Mainz 05 players
FC Metz players
CS Sedan Ardennes players
AC Avignonnais players
Angoulême Charente FC players
Stade Lavallois players
Racing Club de France Football players
German football managers
SAS Épinal managers
G.D. Interclube managers
West German expatriate footballers
German expatriate football managers
West German expatriate sportspeople in France
Expatriate footballers in France
German expatriate sportspeople in Senegal
Expatriate football managers in Senegal
German expatriate sportspeople in Angola
Expatriate football managers in Angola
West German footballers
West German football managers
West German expatriate football managers
German expatriate sportspeople in France
Expatriate football managers in France
German expatriate sportspeople in Burkina Faso
Expatriate football managers in Burkina Faso